is a Japanese actress. She won the award for best actress at the 5th Yokohama Film Festival and the award for best supporting actress at the 8th Hochi Film Award for Ryuji.

Selected filmography

Film
 Crazy Fruit (1981)
 Ryuji (1983)
 Seburi Monogatari (1985)
 Like a Rolling Stone (1994)
 Beneath the Shadow (2020)

Television  
 Hanekonma (1986)

References

Living people
Japanese actresses
Year of birth missing (living people)